The X-Group Culture was an ancient civilization that existed from ca. 300 CE to ca. 600 CE. It was centered in Nubia stretching from the Dodekaschoinos in the north to Delgo in the south. George A. Reisner coined the term X-Group Culture for lack of a more exact historical definition.

This anonymous type of terminology has been replaced by the term Ballana culture due to the increase of knowledge and new findings in Qustul and Ballana as proposed by Bruce Trigger.

Gallery

References

History of Nubia
African civilizations
Nubia